Chad Taylor may refer to:

 Chad Taylor (drummer) (born 1973), American drummer and composer
 Chad Taylor (guitarist) (born 1970), American guitarist in the bands The Gracious Few and Live
 Chad Taylor (politician) (born 1973), District Attorney of Shawnee County, Kansas
 Chad Taylor (writer) (born 1964), New Zealand writer